William "Bill" Berloni is an American animal behaviorist, humanitarian, and author, known for his training of rescue and breeder animals for stage, film, and television. Currently the subject of Discovery Family Reality Show premiering August 2015.

Personal life

"Bill Berloni graduated from Berlin high school in Connecticut desiring to be an actor. While a theater major at Central Connecticut State University he apprenticed at the Goodspeed Opera House in East Haddam, Connecticut.
During his second season of volunteering at Goodspeed the producer Martin Charnin offered him an opportunity to get in the Actors' Equity Association. The offer was contingent upon his finding and training a dog for the new musical they were producing called "Annie". Being a wide eyed kid at the time, he agreed and adopted his first Sandy dog from a local shelter, thus beginning a new career direction." Since that first Sandy, Bill has not only given acting careers to many shelter dogs in film, television and stage, but also has found loving homes for  thousands of dogs over the years."

Career

Bill Berloni to star in Discovery Family Network Reality Show "From Wags to Riches with Bill Berloni" set to premier August 2015.

Berloni is American Animal Advocate and Behaviorist for the Humane Society of New York. 

Bill Berloni is the only Animal trainer to have been honored with a Tony

Berloni was presented with the Tony Honors for Excellence in Theatre during the 65th Tony Awards.

Bill Berloni is known training numerous shelter animals for film and television including Charlie Wilson's War, Disney Channel Original Movie Frenemies and the Sony Pictures "Annie 2014 Film" starring Quvenzhané Wallis and Jamie Foxx due in theaters Christmas 2014.

Bill discovered the newest Sandy, Marti, a 4-year-old Chow Mix who was abandoned at a high kill shelter Georgia then spent two years in various shelters finally ending up in Westchester County, New York where Bill adopted and trained her.

Bill is a published author known for his book "Broadway Tail"
and has been featured on many news shows including The Today Show, CBS Sunday Morning, CBS News and Arise Entertainment 360 TV

Filmography

Awards and nominations

References

External links

American humanitarians
Year of birth missing (living people)
Living people
American animal welfare workers